Methylenedioxyphencyclidine (3',4'-MD-PCP, MDPCP) is a recreational designer drug with dissociative effects. It is an arylcyclohexylamine derivative, with similar effects to related drugs such as 3-MeO-PCP and 4-MeO-PCP.

See also 
 3-F-PCP
 3-Methyl-PCPy
 MXiPr
 MDMAR
 Methylenedioxyphenmetrazine
 Methylenedioxypyrovalerone
 1-Methylamino-1-(3,4-methylenedioxyphenyl)propane

References 

Arylcyclohexylamines
Designer drugs
Benzodioxoles